Pomaria may refer to:

Places and jurisdictions 
 Pomaria, the Roman municipality and former bishopric in Mauretania on the site of modern Tlemcen, in Algeria, now a Latin Catholic titular see
 Pomaria, South Carolina, USA
 Pomaria (Summer–Huggins House), on the list of NRHPs in South Carolina
 Pomaria, a region of Henderson, Auckland, New Zealand

Other 
 Pomaria (plant), a legume genus in the Caesalpinioideae